The Afrin offensive (January–March 2018) was a military operation launched by the Turkish Armed Forces and the Turkish-backed Free Syrian Army against the Syrian Democratic Forces in Afrin District in northwestern Syria as the initial phase of Operation Olive Branch. At the end of military operations, the UN had registered 150,000 Kurdish refugees in camps in the area of Tel Rifaat; the Syrian Observatory for Human Rights (SOHR) estimated that 300,000 people had been expelled in total. By May, SOHR estimated that 40,000 settlers had been moved into Afrin, some of them Arabs displaced from eastern Ghouta, but mostly families of the mixed Arab and Syrian Turkmen militias.

Offensive

Initial TFSA-Turkish advances 
The Turkish government announced the start of the offensive on 19 January 2018, with Turkish Defence Minister Nurettin Canikli stating, "The operation has actually de facto started with cross-border shelling." He added no troops had crossed into Afrin. Syria warned against an eventual invasion, and announced it would target Turkish fighter jets. Turkey intensified its shelling later, while People's Protection Units (YPG) stated that 70 shells had been fired overnight. After days of shelling, Turkish fighter jets on 20 January 2018 carried out air strikes on the border district targeting positions held by the PYD and YPG groups.

Turkish media reported that 20 buses carrying Turkish-backed Syrian opposition rebels had crossed into Syria through the Öncüpınar border crossing. An AFP photographer stated that 30 buses carrying Syrian fighters had also crossed through the Cilvegözü border crossing.

On 20 January, the pro-PYD Hawar News Agency reported that fighters of the Army of Revolutionaries in the Shahba Canton inflicted damage to the ranks of the Turkish-backed Syrian National Army as they killed 4 SNA fighters, and wounded 5 others, in a response to the recent mortar and artillery bombardments of civilian areas. YPG forces fired rockets on Turkish border towns Kilis and Reyhanli, where at least one civilian was reported killed among a number of wounded. Turkey announced that its airstrikes had hit 150 targets in Afrin.

The Turkish General Staff made the announcement in a statement published on its website, saying the objective of the mission is to "establish security and stability on our borders and region, to eliminate terrorists of PKK/KCK/PYD-YPG and ISIL." On 21 January 2018, Turkish state media reported that Turkish ground forces had begun to move into Afrin. and had advanced up to  into the territory. SOHR reported that Turkish troops had clashed with Kurdish militias on the northern and western borders of Afrin and entered the towns of Shankil and Adah Manli to the west.

By 22 January 2018, Turkish forces announced the capture of seven villages, although the YPG recaptured two. The same day, the first Turkish soldier was reported killed in the fighting. By 23 January, territorial gains of the pro-Turkish forces were still "limited". Both sides said to have inflicted numerous casualties on each other, including a high-ranking TFSA commander, amid the back-and-forth fighting for several strategic points at the border. Meanwhile, about 5,000 civilians had fled the Turkish advance in the contested areas, relocating into the central areas of Afrin Region.

On 27 January, in the first case of a Kurdish suicide attack against Turkish forces, female Kurdish YPJ fighter Zuluh Hemo (a.k.a. "Avesta Habur") reportedly threw a grenade down the turret of a Turkish tank, destroying the tank and killing two Turkish soldiers and herself. The reported attack took place during fighting in the village of al-Hammam. The Turkish military denied that any Turkish soldiers had been killed or injured in the incident, and also said that Hemo blew herself up with a grenade in her mouth.

On 28 January, pro-Turkish forces achieved their first major victory by capturing the strategic Barsaya mountain after several previous attacks on the mountain since 22 January failed due to Kurdish resistance. According to Kurdish reports, Kurdish fighters once again pushed back the Turkish-led forces from the mountain the following day, although Turkey disputed this, with Turkish commander Lt. Gen. İsmail Metin Temel, who was leading the operation, reportedly visiting Barsaya.

At the start of February, some rebel factions fighting on behalf of the Turkish army reportedly withdrew from Afrin in order to fight the Syrian army.

On 6 February, a convoy from the eastern parts of SDF-controlled Northern Syria carrying YPG as well as Yazidi YBŞ and YJÊ fighters passed through government-held territory and arrived in the city of Afrin after an agreement for the transfer was approved by Damascus. Their number was unclear, but estimates ranged from 500 to 5,000. There had been reports that the agreement, as well as a recent halt in Turkish airstrikes on the Afrin region, was approved after the Turkish troop deployment in the Aleppo province and the downing of a Russian Su-25 by rebels in the Idlib province, located close to Turkish troops on 3 February. A commander among the pro-Syrian government forces also said that the army had deployed air defenses and anti-aircraft missiles to the front lines that are near Turkish positions and cover the airspace of the Syrian north including Afrin. According to Turkish sources, Russia temporarily closed Syrian airspace to Turkey to establish an electronic defense mechanism against the shoulder-launched missiles since the night of 4 February. According to the report, Turkish armed drones can still operate in Afrin.

On 9 February, the Syrian airspace was reopened for Turkish jets. On 10 February, a Turkish T129 ATAK attack helicopter crashed with both crew members being killed. According to Turkish President Erdoğan, the SDF, and SOHR, the helicopter was shot down. The Turkish Prime Minister also confirmed that a helicopter had been downed, while the Turkish military did not give a cause for the crash but stated an investigation was being conducted. The SDF on 17 February claimed a cross-border attack on Turkish forces and its allies in Kırıkhan. Turkish media had reported two Turkish soldiers and five Syrian rebels being wounded when a police station was hit by mortar fire in Kırıkhan.

Entry of pro-Syrian government forces 
On 19 February, Syrian Arab News Agency (SANA) reported that the Syrian government had reached a deal with the YPG in Afrin. Turkish FM Mevlüt Çavuşoğlu responded that they welcomed Syrian forces if they wanted to fight the YPG, stating, "If so, there is no problem. However, if they are entering [Afrin] to protect YPG/PKK, nobody can stop the Turkish army". Nuri Mahmoud, a YPG spokesman, told Al-Jazeera that they had called on pro-Syrian government forces "to preserve a united Syria" but added they hadn't arrived yet. However, a while later, Nuri denied they had reached an agreement with the Syrian government.

On 20 February, Turkish President Erdoğan stated that Turkey had thwarted the possible deployment of pro-Syrian government forces into the Afrin area after talks with Russian President Vladimir Putin. Meanwhile, Russian Foreign Minister Sergei Lavrov said that the situation in Afrin could be resolved through direct dialogue between Damascus and Ankara. On the same day, the TFSA linked the Bulbul area with Azaz, after capturing the Deir al-Sawan village.

Later on 20 February, pro-Syrian government militias calling themselves the "Popular Forces" entered YPG-held Afrin. The Baqir Brigade, part of the Local Defence Forces (LDF) militia network, announced that it would be leading those forces. A convoy of pro-Syrian government troops entered the region to support the YPG, but was hit by Turkish forces, who fired "warning shots". Anadolu Agency stated that pro-Syrian government troops withdrew  from Afrin town because of the warning shots. SANA confirmed Turkish artillery involvement but didn't mention any retreat. President Erdoğan said that the militias were repelled by Turkish artillery, adding that the convoy consisted of "terrorists" who acted independently. He also stated, "Unfortunately, these kind of terror organizations take wrong steps with the decisions they take. It is not possible for us to allow this. They will pay a heavy price."

Ex-PYD co-chair Salih Muslim Muhammad meanwhile denied any political agreement with the Syrian government, stating the agreement about Afrin was purely military. The Syrian state media on 21 February announced the arrival of more pro-Syrian government forces. A commander of an alliance fighting for the Syrian government stated that pro-government militias in Afrin had retaliated after being attacked by Turkish-backed rebels during the preceding night.

By 26 February, the YPG had been pushed back from most of the border with Turkey. During the day, Deputy Prime Minister Bekir Bozdag announced the deployment of police special forces in Afrin for a new battle. The Turkish government stated on 28 February that the United Nations' recent Syrian ceasefire resolution didn't cover Afrin, and that Turkey wasn't a part of the Syrian conflict. On the next day, the SOHR stated that Turkish forces and its allies had taken complete control for the border, which was also confirmed by Turkish media. Meanwhile, Turkish forces were fighting to capture the towns of Jandairis and Rajo.

Encirclement of Afrin city 
The TAF stated on 1 March that eight Turkish soldiers were killed, while 13 were wounded in clashes. SOHR stated that Turkish airstrikes in the village of Jamaa killed 17 pro-government fighters overnight. Doğan News Agency stated that a Turkish helicopter evacuating wounded had to return when it was hit. 36 militiamen belonging to the NDF were killed in Turkish airstrikes two days later on a camp in Kafr Jina, per SOHR.

On 3 March, the Turkish-led forces stated that they had captured Rajo, one of the major Kurdish strongholds in western Afrin. It was reported that Turkish-led forces quickly breached its defenses and captured it in an hour. However, SOHR reported that the town was still contested, although the TFSA had captured 70 percent of it. The TFSA/TSK also stated the capturing of six villages, including two on the Jinderes district axis, as well as the Bafilyun mountain west of Azaz, making quick gains in recent days. The next day, Rajo was still under heavy Turkish bombardment as the TFSA was attempting to take full control of the town. The SDF confirmed pro-Turkish forces had entered the town and that clashes were continuing during the morning. Later in the day, the SOHR reported large parts of Rajo were captured, while the TFSA had also entered Shaykh al-Hadid. On 5 March, Rajo was confirmed by the SOHR to had been captured by the TFSA. After the capture of Rajo the TFSA also captured the notorious "black prison" near Rajo, which was known to be used by the YPG to jail and torture Kurdish dissents as well as anti-Assad activists and rebels.

On 6 March, the SDF announced that it had shifted 1,700 personnel from their frontlines in the Middle Euphrates river valley in Deir ez-Zor to Afrin. Between 8 and 9 March, the Turkish Army, alongside the TFSA, captured Jandairis and the Afrin Dam, reaching the outskirts of Afrin on 10 March. On 12 March, Turkish Forces had severed the water supply to the city of Afrin, and also cut off the city's Internet access.

By 13 March, Turkish troops announced they had now surrounded the city later confirmed by the UK based human rights group, the Syrian Observatory for Human Rights (SOHR). On the next day, seven people were killed in Turkish shelling on Afrin. Between eight and ten pro-government fighters were killed in Turkish airstrikes to the south of Afrin.

By then, SDF troops had moved into Afrin from other areas, including retreating troops from the unsuccessful defense of Jinderes, and dozens of international volunteers, reinforcing the troop numbers there, and preparing defenses. By Mid March, civilians started arriving in the city, organizing themselves as human shields in anticipation of the attack while another 2000 civilians fled the city, in advance of the Turkish troops.

Capture of Afrin city 

On 15 March, Turkish artillery bombardment against the city increased, with 12 people killed and 60 injured. Food shortages were reported in the city, with long queues at bakeries. Turkey allowed people to exit the city through the one remaining road, with about 10,000 people exiting the city. Turkey started dropping flyers on the city on 15 March, urging the Kurdish and allied fighters to give up, and asking civilians to stay away from "terrorist" positions. Turkish artillery fire continued on the next day, killing another 16 people. Meanwhile, the YPG stated that a Turkish airstrike hit the main hospital in the city - the only functioning hospital - resulting in 16 civilians dead. The Hospital had already been inundated with injured people from the region, fleeing Turkish advances. Turkish drone footage released the next day showed the hospital intact.

On 17 March, Turkish and TFSA forces started their ground attack on the city. They met light resistance and penetrated to the center of the city. Most of the population had left, and rather than engaging the Turkish forces, most of the SDF had retreated, leaving only a small resistance behind. On 18 March, TAF forces posted pictures from the center of the city, which appeared to be largely empty. Turkish troops initially shot at, and then removed with a bulldozer, a statue of Kawa, a legendary Kurdish figure, in the center of the town, and raised Turkish flags throughout the city. The city was captured with little losses by the TAF and little losses by the SDF in their withdrawal. SDF troops had withdrawn to government-held areas, or to SDF areas east of the Euphrates. SDF troops had been ordered to withdraw, though a few minor pockets refused orders and stayed to combat the Turkish forces. The UN High Commissioner for Human Rights Zeid Ra’ad Al Hussein said of the capture: "In the city of Afrin, which was captured by Turkish forces yesterday, scores of civilians have been killed and injured due to airstrikes, ground-based strikes, and explosive hazards, and thousands have been displaced."

After the capture of Afrin, which had been deserted by most of its residents, Turkish-backed fighters then began stealing vehicles and goods, looting the homes, businesses, and political and military sites. In response to these events, the Turkish military and allied TFSA units, including the Syrian Interim Government's Military Police, set up checkpoints in front of the city, and arrested several looters. Some battalions of the TFSA's 3rd Corps were disbanded due to their participation in the thefts. The Levant Front announced that they dismissed 52 of its members, due to assault on the properties of civilians.

Aftermath 

A PYD spokesman had announced shortly after the capture of Afrin city that the SDF would continue to fight the pro-Turkish forces using guerilla tactics. On 4 May, the YPG also declared that they would target the family members of rebel fighters active in Afrin region, as well as refugees that were settled in Afrin. The "Wrath of Olives" operation room was established in early summer, 2018. The YPG has denied being affiliated with this group, which has been active all over Turkish-held Syria. By May 2018, an insurgency had broken out in Afrin District, as YPG holdouts and allied militants, calling themselves the "Afrin Falcons", were carrying out bombings, ambushes and assassinations against the Turkish army, the TFSA, and civilian sympathizers.

After the Turkish-led forces captured Afrin District in early 2018, they began to implement a resettlement policy by moving Arab refugees from southern Syria into the empty homes that belonged to displaced locals.

The border crossing between Afrin and Turkey reopened in November 2018.

On 18 November 2018, the Turkish Army and Turkish-backed rebel factions launched an operation against a group named al-Sharqiya Martyrs of about 200 fighters who were accused of disobey and commit abuses. A rebel commander named Mahmoud ‘Azazi was killed on 19 November and a mass rebel surrender took place on the same day. The clashes left 25 fighters dead.

On 28 April 2020, a bombing in Afrin killed 40 people, including 11 children. No group claimed responsibility. Turkey blamed the YPG for the attack. According to the head of the British-based Observatory for human rights in Syria, at least six pro-Turkish Syrian fighters were among those killed in the blast with a possibility of increase in the death toll. At least 47 people were reported injured, according to Al Jazeera. The explosion was believed to have been caused by the rigging of a fuel tanker with hand grenades, the governor of Hatay province of the neighboring Turkish border stated. Many people, alongside those who got trapped in their cars were burnt to death as a result of the blast, Syrian activists disclosed.

References

Conflicts in 2018
Military operations of the Syrian civil war in 2018
Military operations of the Syrian civil war in 2017
Military operations of the Syrian civil war involving Turkey
Military operations of the Syrian civil war involving the Free Syrian Army
Military operations of the Syrian civil war involving the Syrian Democratic Forces
Military operations of the Syrian civil war involving the Syrian government
January 2018 events in Syria
February 2018 events in Syria
March 2018 events in Syria